Adriano Facchini may refer to:

 Adriano Facchini (pentathlete) (1927–1969), Italian modern pentathlete
 Adriano Facchini (footballer) (born 1983), Brazilian footballer